A Mother (Danish: En moder) is a sculpture created by Danish sculptor Hans Peder Pedersen-Dan in 1908. A bronze cast of the sculpture was installed outside Hvidovre Rytterskole on Hvidovrevej in Hvidovre in 2005. Pedersen-Dan and his wife Johanne Pedersen-Dan lived and worked in the building for more than 20 years. They are buried at the adjacent Hvidovre Cemetery.

Description
The sculpture depicts a kneeling woman with naked torso and three small children. The woman leans forward and her arms are pushed backwards to shield the children that clings to her back.

History
Hans Pedersen-Dan and Johanne Pedersen-Dan married in 1892. The couple had no children but adopted a girl, Rigmor. Dan-Pedersen created A Mother in 1908. The sculpture was directly inspired by Rigmor's biological mother, who is portrayed with her three remaining children. The Pedersen-Dan Family took over Hvidovre Rytterskole in 1912. They lived in the building until 1936.

References

External links

1908 sculptures
Outdoor sculptures in Copenhagen
Bronze sculptures in Copenhagen
Sculptures of children in Denmark
Buildings and structures in Hvidovre Municipality
2005 establishments in Denmark
Statues of women in Copenhagen
Sculptures by Hans Peder Pedersen-Dan